Mark "The Shark" Thorson (born July 19, 1983) is a former American football quarterback who played one season with the Utah Blaze of the Arena Football League. He played college football at Western Oregon University and attended Sandy High School in Sandy, Oregon. He was also a member of the Boise Burn of the af2.

College career
Thorson played for the Western Oregon Wolves from 2004 to 2007. He helped his team to a 20–12 record as a three-year starter and set school records with 987 pass attempts, 568 pass completions, 60 passing touchdowns and 63 total touchdowns.

Professional career

Boise Burn
Thorson signed with the Boise Burn of the af2 in December 2008. He finished the 2009 regular season with four touchdowns and one interception for 165 yards while completing 17 of 31 passes in four games, giving him a QB rating of 88.78.

Utah Blaze
Thorson was signed by the Utah Blaze on June 1, 2010. He played in eight games in 2010, recording 11 touchdowns and four interceptions on 577 passing yards. He was released by the Blaze on December 16, 2011.

References

External links
Just Sports Stats

Living people
1983 births
Players of American football from Oregon
American football quarterbacks
Western Oregon Wolves football players
Boise Burn players
Utah Blaze players
People from Clackamas County, Oregon
Sandy High School alumni